Hydrothrix Hook.f. was previously a monotypic flowering plant genus of Pontederiaceae, but is currently included in a broader and monophyletic Heteranthera.

The highly modified Heteranthera gardneri is a submerged aquatic with a two-flowered pseudanthium found in eastern Brazil. It is used as an aquarium plant.

References

External links

 Hydrothrix on keys.lucidcentral.org

Monotypic Commelinales genera
Pontederiaceae
Flora of Brazil